The Yellowstone Valley Railroad  is a  shortline railroad in northeastern Montana, also crossing into North Dakota. It operates two branch lines leased from the BNSF Railway in 2005 - Snowden to Glendive and Bainville to Scobey - connected by trackage rights over BNSF's Northern Transcon between Snowden and Bainville.

History
The northern segment, from Bainville to Scobey, was constructed by the Great Northern Railway (GN), opening to Plentywood in 1911 and Scobey in 1914. A further extension was built to Opheim and later abandoned. The other line was built as a pair of branch lines connecting Sidney to the GN at Snowden and the Northern Pacific Railway (NP) at Glendive. The Snowden-Sidney piece was completed by the Montana Eastern Railway, a GN subsidiary, in 1915, and the remainder by the NP in 1912. Effective August 15, 2005, the YSVR leased both of these lines from the BNSF Railway, successor to the GN and NP.

References

External links
Yellowstone Valley Railroad

Montana railroads
North Dakota railroads
Watco
Railway companies established in 2005
Spin-offs of the BNSF Railway